Paleologos Soulikias (Παλαιολόγος Σουλικιάς; 13 October 1926 – 17 January 2023) was a Greek-Canadian artist painter, known primarily for his Canadian landscape scenes.

Biography
Soulikias was born in Komotini, Greece on 13 October 1926, and raised in Volos. After the hardships of the German Occupation and the Greek Civil War, he spent time studying art in Athens and in Paris and ultimately settled in Montreal in 1959.  His value as an artist-painter was first recognized in 1965 at a competition among Neo-Canadians, where he received the first prize.  During the same year, Soulikias participated in the exhibition for Quebec artists, organized by the City of Montreal and was invited by mayor Jean Drapeau to sign the city's Golden Book.
He then exhibited his recent works on the Laurentians at the Galerie de la Place for which The Montreal Star art critic Michael Ballantyne praised him and spoke of his 'ravishing harmonies'.

In 1966, Soulikias was married to educator Helen Kantza and began dedicating himself fully to painting by rendering artistically the Canadian autumn and winter.

By 1967, his paintings were shown in known Montreal galleries such as the Galerie Moos Inc. and Galerie Gauvreau and in 1968 he began a long collaboration with Galerie L'Art français.  On one of his exhibitions there, art critic Hélène Ouellet wrote:

...by his grasp of landscape, this European artist is renewing the rich tradition of the Group of Seven and of all those Canadian artists who have made nature their guide and inspiration.
 
By 1974, he began his association with The Dominion Gallery and in 1982 the gallery's owner, Dr Max Stern offered him a joint exhibition together with sculptor Henry Moore which was associated with the presentation of a book on Paul Soulikias' works published in the Marcel Broquet Signatures series.  Since then, he has exhibited his works in Montreal, Quebec City, Toronto, New York, Athens and elsewhere in Canada, the USA and Greece.

A second book was published in November 1996 for which an exhibition was held at the Montreal Museum of Fine Arts.  In 1997, the Canadian Embassy in Greece organized an exhibition for Soulikias in Thessaloniki as part of Canada's representation in that city's European Capital of Culture events.  In 2004, he was honoured by the Olympic City of Nea Ionia with an exhibition as part of the cultural events of the Athens 2004 Olympic Games.

For the exhibition in October 2006 to mark the artist's eightieth birthday, the art critic Robert Bernier wrote:
Paul Soulikias did not only last but has also contributed to the adventure of painting of the twentieth century in Quebec...and continues.

Soulikias died of pneumonia in Larissa, Greece, on 17 January 2023, at the age of 96.

Work 

Paul Soulikias was a figurative artist painter with influences from expressionism. Critics have repeatedly praised his colour harmonies and composition as opposed to detail, his warm tones and personal style.  Apart from the Laurentians, his work had been informed by several travels, primarily in Greece, the Northeastern United States and the Maritimes as well as from his visit to Mexico in 1982.  A large number of his paintings are still lifes and portraits, chiefly female.  Although the majority of his work is in oil colours, he had also worked in gouache, watercolours, charcoal and mixed media.

His paintings are shown in galleries in Montreal and in the city's Museum of Fine Arts.  They are also in many public and private institutions such as the Musée national des beaux-arts du Québec, City of Montreal, Reader's Digest, Telephone Quebec, Gazoduc TQM, ABB Group, Thiro Ltee, the National Bank of Greece and others as well as in many private collections throughout Canada, the USA and Europe.

Exhibitions 

 1956   Tourist Office, Volos Greece
 1963   Galerie La Mansard, Montreal
 1965   Galerie de la Place, Montreal
 1967   Eaton's Gallery, Montreal
 1969   Artists' Association, Chicoutimi
 1970   University of Ottawa (with the cooperation of Wallack Gallery)
 1971   Galerie L'art français, Montreal
 1972   Artists' Association, Rockport, Massachusetts
 1973   Galerie L'art français, Montreal
 1974   M.Vaianos Cultural Centre, Athens
 1975   Galerie L'art français, Montreal
 1975   Galerie d'art Montcalm, Quebec City
 1977   Galerie L'art français, Montreal
 1978   Galerie d'Artagnan, Quebec City
 1978   Centre Culturel de Verdun
 1979   Galerie L'art français, Montreal
 1980   Galerie L'art français, Montreal
 1982   Dominion Gallery, Montreal
 1983   K.G. Heffel Gallery, Vancouver
 1984   Kasspar Gallery, Toronto
 1984   G.Press & T.O., New York
 1984   Galerie d'art Clarance Gagnon, Montreal
 1985   Galerie d'art Vincent, Ottawa
 1985   Kreonidis Gallery, Athens 
 1987   Galerie d'art Rimouski (unveiling of P.Soulikias' painting featured on the front cover of the Quebec City Telephone Directory)
 1989   Wilfert's Hambleton Galleries, Kelowna
 1992   Galerie d'arts contemporains, Montreal
 1995   Melas Mansion of the National Bank of Greece, Athens
 1996   Giorgio de Chirico Cultural Centre, Volos, Greece
 1997   Museum of Fine Arts, Montreal
 1997   Picture Gallery of the Polytechnic School of Thessalonica, Thessaloniki Cultural Capital of Europe
 1997   Porphyrogeneion Foundation, Agria, Volos, Greece
 1997   Centre of Contemporary Art, Larissa, Greece
 2001   Margonis Art Gallery, Larissa, Greece
 2001   Municipal Picture Gallery, Karditsa, Greece
 2004   Metaxourgio, Nea Ionia (Olympic City for the 2004 Olympics, Volos, Greece
 2005   Municipality of Sparta
 2006   Galerie Lamoureux Ritzenhoff, Montreal
 2007   Giorgio de Chirico Cultural Centre, Volos, Greece
 2008   French Institute, Larissa
 2009   Honorary exhibition by the Prefecture of Magnesia at the Cultural Centre of Nea Ionia, Volos, Greece
 2016   Honorary exhibition by the Ark of Magnesia at the Cultural Centre of Nea Ionia, Volos, Greece

References

Sources 

 Ballantyne, Michael (1965). 'Civic Support For The Arts'. The Montreal Star. 10 January. 
 Ballantyne, Michael (1965). 'A Short Stroll For The Visual Arts'. The Montreal Star. 10 July. 
 Ballantyne, Michael (1965). 'A Fresh Look At The Laurentians'. The Montreal Star. 4 December 18. 
 Bernier, Robert. (2006). 'Paul Soulikias: Imposer ses harmonies'. Parcours: Art & art de vivre.(12)3,52-53.
 Ouellet, Hélène (1971). 'Paul Soulikias'. "Vie Des Arts". no.63, 71.
 Paul Soulikias: exhibition. (2004). Volos: Cultural Department of Nea Ionia's City Hall-Magnesia. (Pamphlet)
 Paul Soulikias. (1997). Thessaloniki: Thessaloniki Cultural Capital of Europe 1997. (Pamphlet)
 Roussan de, Jacques, eds. (1996). Paul Soulikias. Montreal: Roussan éditeur.  (2921212242).
 "Steppin' Out" (1982). CBC television Montreal Channel 6. 25 November.
 Waller, Adrian. (1982). P. Soulikias / texte Adrian Waller ; préface Jean Brouillet ; traduction en français Marie-Sylvie Fortier-Rolland. La Prairie, Quebec: Éditions Marcel Broquet. .

External links 

 
Galerie Lamoureux Ritzenhoff
Galerie Perreault
I.A.F.
 CBC – Stepping Out

1926 births
2023 deaths
Modern painters
Artists from Montreal
Canadian painters
Greek painters
Greek emigrants to Canada
People from Volos